Clearview is the seventh studio album by Finnish alternative rock band Poets of the Fall, released on 30 September 2016 through Insomniac.

Track listing

iTunes Store bonus track

Reception
A review on Sputnik Music says: "Clearview is a solid release from Poets of the Fall that is only let down by playing things a bit too safe on the instrumental side."

Charts

References

2016 albums
Poets of the Fall albums